Anna Stolli is a London-based West End actress and singer, best known for her work in musical theatre.

Theatre

Musical

 Trish in Kinky Boots West End and Kinky Boots UK Musical on Film https://m.youtube.com/watch?v=1ul5BI-woDY&feature=youtu.be
 Little Women (Hope Mill, Manchester)
 Rosie in Mamma Mia! (International Tour)
 Snow White and the Seven Dwarfs (Buxton Opera House)
 Shakespeare Revue (UK Tour)
 Stiles & Drewe's 3 Little Pigs (UK Tour)
 Bumblescratch at West End Live 2016
 Love Birds (The Pleasance, Edinburgh)
 Duncton Wood (Union Theatre (London)
 Sleeping Beauty (Salisbury Playhouse) 
 Irish Wings (European Tour)
 Rue Magique (Kings Head London)
 White Christmas
 Do I Hear A Waltz? (Landor Theatre)
 Fame
 Boys In the Buff (Pleasance at Edinburgh Festival)
 The King and I (Aberystwyth Arts Cente)
 Saucy Jack and the Space Vixens (London and Pleasance at Edinburgh Festival)
 A Slice of Saturday Night (Big Little)
 Crazy For You (Aberystwyth Arts Centre)
 South Pacific Apollo Leisure
 The Rocky Horror Show
 Thursford Extravaganza

Stage
 Beautiful Thing (BAC)
 The Life and Crimes of President Ubu (Oxford and Edinburgh Festival)
 Run For Your Wife
 Funny Money
 It Runs In the Family
 The Master and Margarita (Greenwich Theatre)
 Of Bright and Dark (White Bear Theatre)

References

External links
Anna Stolli on Spotlight

Alumni of the Mountview Academy of Theatre Arts
Living people
English stage actresses
English musical theatre actresses
20th-century English actresses
21st-century English actresses
Actresses from London
English women singers
Singers from London
Year of birth missing (living people)